{{DISPLAYTITLE:C9H8O5}}
The molecular formula C9H8O5 (molar mass: 196.16 g/mol, exact mass: 196.037173 u) may refer to:

 2,4,5-Trihydroxycinnamic acid
 Flavipin